The 1981 Dallas Cowboys season was their 22nd in the league. The team matched their previous output of 12–4, winning their fifth division title in six years. They lost the Conference Championship game for the second straight season.

The season began with four straight victories, followed by two losses (including a surprising 45–14 blowout loss to the 49ers in week six).  The Cowboys rebounded to win 8 of their last 9 games to clinch the NFC East but had to settle for the conference's number two seed behind the 49ers.

The Cowboys easily defeated Tampa Bay in the divisional playoff to earn a rematch with the 49ers in the NFC Championship Game.  The game was much closer this time, and the Cowboys still held a 27–21 lead with less than a minute to play.  However, Joe Montana led a late drive and hit Dwight Clark in the famous "Catch" to give San Francisco a 28–27 lead. On the ensuing Cowboys possession, Danny White completed a pass to Drew Pearson, and was only an arms length away from breaking free from Eric Wright and most likely scoring a touchdown. Jim Stuckey recovered a White fumble on the next play, then the 49ers ran out the clock for the win.

Offseason

NFL Draft

Undrafted free agents

Schedule

Division opponents are in bold text

Game notes

Week 1

Week 2

Week 3

Week 4

Week 5

Week 6

Week 7

Week 8

Week 9

Week 10

Week 11

Week 12

Week 13

Week 14

Week 15

Week 16

Playoffs

Divisional Round

Conference Championship

Standings

Roster

References

Dallas Cowboys seasons
NFC East championship seasons
Dallas Cowboys
Dallas